The 1913 Epsom Derby, sometimes referred to as “The Suffragette Derby”, was a horse race which took place at Epsom Downs on 4 June 1913. It was the 134th running of the Derby. The race was won, controversially, by Aboyeur at record 100–1 odds. The winner was ridden by Edwin Piper and trained by Alan Cunliffe.

The race was overshadowed by the death of suffragette Emily Davison, who was killed when she ran out in front of King George V's horse, Anmer. The horse struck Davison as she tried to grab the horse's reins; the injuries she received proved fatal as she died 4 days later. Davison was a militant suffragette and a member of the Women's Social and Political Union (WSPU), she campaigned throughout her life for votes for women in the United Kingdom.

The race was attended by an estimated 500,000 people, including the King and Queen.

Race details

Aboyeur, ridden by Edwin Piper, took an early lead which he maintained into the straight, where he ran about three horse-widths away from the inside rail to his left. Several challengers emerged: Craganour challenged the leader on his immediate outside (right), with Nimbus and Great Sport further out, while Shogun, Louvois and Day Comet moved up on the inside. The initial interference occurred when Craganour, ridden by Johnny Reiff, hung left, bumping Aboyeur who in turn veered towards the rail, badly hampering Shogun, Louvois and Day Comet. Piper, then struck his horse with his whip in his left hand, causing Aboyeur to hang sharply back to the centre of the track, colliding with Craganour and attempting to bite him. Throughout the final furlong Reiff, with his whip in his right hand, and Piper, with his whip in his left, continued to drive their horses into each other, leading to repeated bumps as the other horses drew nearer. Craganour crossed the line first in a blanket finish, just ahead of Aboyeur, Day Comet, Louvois, Great Sport and Nimbus, with Shogun, Sun Yat and Bachelor's Wedding finishing just behind.

After a brief pause, the Judge, Mr Robinson announced the result as Craganour first, Aboyeur second, Louvois third, having apparently missed Day Comet on the inside who had been obscured by other runners. The result would not have been official however until the Stewards (senior racecourse officials) announced that everything was “All Right”. After a delay, the announcement was made and then immediately withdrawn. It was then announced that an official objection had been lodged against the winner, not by a rival jockey, as was customary, but by the Stewards themselves. After a lengthy inquiry in which the Judge and the jockeys were interviewed, the Stewards disqualified Craganour on the grounds that he had failed to keep a straight course and had thereby “jostled”, “bumped and bored” and “interfered” with other runners. The race was awarded to Aboyeur, with Louvois second and Great Sport third.

Emily Davison

Davison positioned herself at Tattenham Corner, the bend before the home straight. At this point in the race, with some of the horses having passed her, she ducked under the guard rail and ran onto the course.

Anmer fell in the collision and partly rolled over his jockey, who had his foot momentarily caught in the stirrup. Davison was knocked to the ground; some reports say she was kicked in the head by Anmer, but the surgeon who operated on Davison stated that "I could find no trace of her having been kicked by a horse". The event was captured by three newsreel cameras.

Davison's purpose in attending the Derby and walking onto the course is unclear. She did not discuss her plans with anyone or leave a note. Several theories have been suggested, including that she intended to cross the track, believing that all horses had passed; that she wanted to pull down the King's horse; that she was trying to attach one of the WSPU flags to a horse; or that she intended to throw herself in front of one of the horses.

The WSPU were quick to describe her as a martyr, part of a campaign to identify her as such. The Suffragette newspaper marked Davison's death by issuing a copy showing a female angel with raised arms standing in front of the guard rail of a racecourse. The paper's editorial stated that "Davison has proved that there are in the twentieth-century people who are willing to lay down their lives for an ideal". Biblical phraseology was used in the issue to describe her act, including "Greater love hath no man than this, that he lay down his life for his friends", which Gullickson reports as being repeated several times in subsequent discussions of the events. A year after the Derby, The Suffragette included "The Price of Liberty", an essay by Davison. In it, she had written "To lay down life for friends, that is glorious, selfless, inspiring! But to re-enact the tragedy of Calvary for generations yet unborn, that is the last consummate sacrifice of the Militant".

Winner's details
Further details of the winner, Aboyeur:
 Foaled: 1910
 Sire: Desmond; Dam: Pawky
 Owner: Alan Cunliffe
 Breeder: 	T. K. Laidlaw

See also
Suffragette bombing and arson campaign

References

Sources

 
 
 
 
 
 
 
 
 

Epsom Derby
 1913
Epsom Derby
Epsom Derby
20th century in Surrey